Davidsonville Historic State Park (formerly Old Davidsonville State Park) is a  Arkansas state park in Randolph County, Arkansas in the United States. Situated on a border between The Ozarks and the Arkansas Delta, the park preserves the remains of the abandoned frontier town of Davidsonville. The town was one of Arkansas Territory's first settlements when founded in 1815, serving as an important river port town on the Black River. The former townsite was made into a state park in 1957 and a monument was added to the National Register of Historic Places in 1974.

History

Davidsonville
There is evidence that the site was occupied by French colonists prior to the 1803 Louisiana Purchase.  Archeologists have discovered evidence of Native American use of the site as early as 4,000 BC.  The 1822 courthouse was apparently built on top of an Indian mound which was built before 1,100 AD.

Davidsonville was founded in 1815 and rapidly became the most important town in northeast Arkansaw Territory, but was abandoned by the 1830s. The community served as a river port town on the west bank of the Black River, near the confluence of the Spring River and Eleven Point River with the Black River. The town was on important stop on the Southwest Trail and featured several important frontier establishments. In 1817 the first post office of Arkansas Territory opened in the town, followed in 1820 by the first federal land office of the territory.  In 1822, the first courthouse of Arkansas Territory was built in Davidsonville.  The town became the county seat of Lawrence County, which at the time comprised roughly the northern third of Arkansas.

Shortly after the town's founding the Southwest Trail was rerouted onto higher ground, bypassing Davidsonville. New towns appeared along the trail's new route, diminishing Davidsonville's importance. In 1829 the county seat and courthouse began a series of moves to a number of other towns. Today there are very few remains above ground. The townsite, which had been a grid of streets with a central square where the courthouse stood, now looks like a grassy field with a few trees. Only upon closer inspection does one begin to see hints of the former town. The park's interpretive signs point out where certain buildings used to stand. There are two small cemeteries. By the time of Arkansas statehood in 1836, Davidsonville was essentially abandoned.

Park history

Old Davidsonville State Park was created in 1957.  The park offers interpretive programs, camping, hiking, fishing, and canoeing.  Park facilities were originally built on the old townsite. The site was listed on the U.S. National Register of Historic Places in 1974 as "Old Davidsonville State Historic Monument", also known as Lawrence-Davidsonville. During the 1980s the townsite was cleared in order to facilitate archeological studies.  The park facilities are now located on nearby ridges.  The first careful archeological study was conducted in 1972, and several others followed.

Recreation
Although one of Arkansas's historic state parks, there are opportunities for recreation at Davidsonville Historic State Park also. Fishing is available on the Black River, Eleven Point River, Spring River, and a small fishing pond within the park. An interpretive guide is available for tours of the original platted site year round. Picnic tables, screened pavilions, playgrounds, and a visitor's center with gift shop. Campers can utilize the 30 campsites (twelve class AAA, eight class A, ten tent).

See also

 Arkansas Highway 166
 Historic Washington State Park

References

External links

State parks of Arkansas
Former populated places in Arkansas
Protected areas of Randolph County, Arkansas
Protected areas established in 1957
Monuments and memorials on the National Register of Historic Places in Arkansas
Archaeological sites on the National Register of Historic Places in Arkansas
National Register of Historic Places in Randolph County, Arkansas
1957 establishments in Arkansas
Mounds in Arkansas